5731 Zeus  is an Apollo asteroid and near-Earth object discovered on 4 November 1988, by Carolyn Shoemaker at Palomar Observatory.  Based on its observed brightness and assumed albedo it is estimated to have a diameter between 2.1 and 4.7 km.

References

External links 
 
 
 

005731
Discoveries by Carolyn S. Shoemaker
Discoveries by Eugene Merle Shoemaker
Named minor planets
19881104